The 1917 Brown Bears football team was an American football team that represented Brown University as an independent during the 1917 college football season. In its 16th season under head coach Edward N. Robinson, Brown compiled an 8–2 and outscored opponents by a total of 160 to 62.

Schedule

References

Brown
Brown Bears football seasons
Brown Bears football